Judith Kincade Blake (March 3, 1926 – April 29, 1993) was an American sociologist and demographer.  She established the first Department of Demography, at the University of California, Berkeley and was the first holder of an endowed chair, at the University of California, Los Angeles.

Blake carried out one of the earliest surveys of fertility and population in a developing country, in Jamaica. In a 1956 publication, she identified a key concept now known as "proximate determinants of fertility", which became a basis for subsequent fertility analysis and policy design. For much of her career, Blake studied the demographics of  families, using available  secondary or national US data sets to examine contemporary  population policy issues. She frequently challenged conventional wisdom, and emphasized that economic theories were insufficient to explain population shifts.  Her book Family Size and Achievement (1989) won the American Sociological Association's William J. Goode Book Award in 1990.

Life
Blake was born and raised in New York City. She was often ill for most of her life. She was raised by three generations of female family members, as her father went to work in California for most of her life growing up.

Career
Blake received a Bachelor of Science degree from Columbia University in 1951, and graduated magna cum laude. While at college, she became interested in social demography through a class taught by Hope Tisdale Eldridge. 
She also met Kingsley Davis, a demographer and professor of sociology. They married in 1954, had a daughter in 1959, and divorced in 1976.

While Blake was a graduate student, she worked as a research assistant at the Bureau of Applied Social Research at Columbia University. Her first publication was a monograph on cities, analyzing demographic data for the Air Force. Her work was one of the earliest surveys on such a topic to be done in a developing country. Previous work in the field of population studies been done by Paul K. Hatt and Joe Stycos in Puerto Rico.

Blake moved to Berkeley, California in 1955. In 1956, she wrote an article entitled "Social Structure and Fertility: An Analytic Framework" with Kingsley Davis, which became a classic paper in her field.  They identified what are now referred to as "proximate determinants of fertility", intermediate factors that immediately influence fertility, determining whether economic, social, and individual conditions will have the opportunity to affect fertility outcomes. Examples include the age at which partners engage in a union and both their intended and actual contraceptive use.  The Davis-Blake intermediate variables provided a framework that is now routinely used in fertility analysis and policy design.

Blake worked as a lecturer at various institutions while completing her Ph.D. She taught first at the  University of California, San Francisco, from 1957 to 1959, as a lecturer at the School of Nursing. She also taught at the University of California, Berkeley, as a lecturer in the Department of Sociology in 1957, and as a lecturer in the Department of Speech from 1961 to 1962. Blake later remarked that she felt that the university did not want female lecturers on staff.

In 1961, Blake received her PhD from Columbia University. Her thesis was published as Family Structure in Jamaica: The social context of reproduction (1961). She was one of the first researchers to study fertility in the context of the social structures surrounding it.

In 1962, Blake became an acting assistant professor of demography at the University of California, Berkeley School of Public Health. In 1965, she established a program in demography, which became the Department of Demography in 1967, with herself as chair.  It was the first department of demography in the United States. The department trained a large amount of demographers working in the United States and abroad. When the department was closed in the 1970s,  Blake moved briefly to Berkeley's School of Public Policy.

Blake spent much of her time studying the demographics of families in the United States, and challenging assumptions and theories through papers such as "Ideal family size among white Americans" (1966) and "Are babies consumer durables?" (1968). She examined attitudes and practices around birth control, finding similarities between Catholics and non-Catholics, and predicted a backlash in attitudes to abortion in "Abortion and Public Opinion" (1971).

In 1976, Blake was recruited to the University of California, Los Angeles, where she became the Fred H. Bixby Professor of Population Policy.  Blake was the first holder of an endowed chair, and was appointed to both sociology and public health.

In 1981, Blake was elected president of the Population Association of America (PAA).  She was made a fellow of the American Association for the Advancement of Science in 1982 and a fellow of the American Academy of Arts and Sciences in 1990.

Blake continued to study families, and observed significant differences in the educational levels and the number of children graduating in large vs. small families. Children from small families did better on an array of measures that she examined. Around 1980 she began to focus on no-child and single-child families. She concluded that single children were not worse off than those from two-children families. Blake published the book Family Size and Achievement in 1989.  The book won the American Sociological Association's William J. Goode Book Award in 1990. 
Blake was also the editor of the Annual Review of Sociology from 1992 to 1993.

Awards and honors
 1990, William J. Goode Book Award, American Sociological Association

Books
 Family Structure in Jamaica: The Social Context of Reproduction (1961)
 Family Size and Achievement (1989)

References

1926 births
1993 deaths
American sociologists
University of California, Los Angeles faculty
American women sociologists
Family sociologists
Fellows of the American Academy of Arts and Sciences
Fellows of the American Association for the Advancement of Science
Demographers
Demographers by nationality
American women non-fiction writers
20th-century American women
20th-century American people
Annual Reviews (publisher) editors